Kenneth Lawrence Clark (May 26, 1948 – August 8, 2021) was a Canadian professional gridiron football punter who played seventeen seasons in the Canadian Football League, World Football League, and National Football League. He led Saint Mary's University to a 14–6 win over McGill University in the 1973 Canadian College Bowl to win the Vanier Cup, and won the Ted Morris Memorial Trophy as the game's Most Valuable Player. He was a punter for the Portland Storm of the WFL in 1974. He played in Super Bowl XIV for the Los Angeles Rams, becoming the second Canadian to play in a Super Bowl.

Clark died at the age of 73 on August 8, 2021.

References

1948 births
2021 deaths
American football punters
Canadian football punters
English players of American football
English players of Canadian football
Hamilton Tiger-Cats players
Los Angeles Rams players
Ottawa Rough Riders players
Portland Storm players
Saint Mary's Huskies football players
Saint Mary's University (Halifax) alumni
Saskatchewan Roughriders players
Canadian players of American football
English emigrants to Canada
Sportspeople from Southampton